Typhlosyrinx vepallida is a species of sea snail, a marine gastropod mollusk in the family Raphitomidae.

Description
The length of the holotype of the shell attains 43.1 mm, its diameter 16.4 mm.

Distribution
This marine species occurs in the Gulf of Aden at a depth of 1840 m.

References

 Martens, E. von & Thiele, J., Die beschalten Gastropoden der deutschen Tiefsee-Expedition 1898-1899
 Powell, A. W. B., 1969, The family Turridae in the Indo-Pacific. Part 2. The subfamily Turriculinae, Indo-Pacific Mo lIusca, 2(10),207-415

External links
 Bouchet, P. & Sysoev, A., 2001. Typhlosyrinx-like tropical deep-water turriform gastropods (Mollusca, Gastropoda, Conoidea). Journal of Natural History 35: 1693-1715
 Biolib.cz: image

vepallida
Gastropods described in 1902